This is a listing of the horses that finished in either first, second, or third place and the number of starters in the Gulfstream Park Handicap, an American Grade 2 race for horses four years old and older at 1 mile on the dirt held at Gulfstream Park in
Hallandale Beach, Florida.  (List 1973–present)

See also 
Gulfstream Park Handicap
Gulfstream Park

References

External links
 The Gulfstream Park Handicap at Pedigree Query

Lists of horse racing results
Gulfstream Park